Furia Esports, stylized as FURIA Esports or simply FURIA, is a Brazilian professional esports organization. Furia competes in Counter-Strike: Global Offensive, Rocket League, League of Legends, Valorant and Rainbow Six: Siege. 

In 2022, Furia was named the fourth biggest esports organization in the world by the North American portal Nerd Street.

History 
Furia was founded in February 2017 by businessman Jaime Pádua, who was planning to invest in electronic sports, and entrepreneurs André Akkari (professional poker player) and Cris Guedes. These two had similar plans and gave Jaime the ability to structure the project.

Counter-Strike: Global Offensive

History 
The team would make their first appearance at a Major just two years after their founding at the IEM Katowice Major 2019, although they were eliminated in the New Challengers Stage. Furia continued to improve for the rest of the year, challenging MIBR as the best team in Brazil and finishing runner-up at ECS Season 7.

The team was the highest seeded team from the Americas region going into PGL Major Stockholm 2021, and were eliminated in the quarterfinals. The team was also eliminated in the quarterfinals of PGL Major Antwerp 2022.

On October 7, 2022, Furia qualified, through the America RMR, to the IEM Rio Major 2022.  With a huge support from the fans in his country, FURIA exceeded expectations and managed to go to the semifinals, until then its best placement in a Major.

The IHC Esports team sensationally outplayed FURIA with a score of 2:1, thanks to which it advanced to the group stage of IEM Katowice 2023.

Achievements 
1st — ESL Pro League Season 12: North America
3rd — ESL Pro League Season 11: North America
3rd/4th — IEM Rio Major 2022
3rd/4th — Intel Extreme Masters Season XVII - Dallas
3rd/4th — ESL Pro League Season 15
3rd/4th — ESL Pro League Season 13
3rd/4th — Dreamhack Masters Dallas 2019
5th-8th — PGL Major Antwerp 2022
5th-8th — PGL Major Stockholm 2021

Current roster

League of Legends

History 
Furia entered the League of Legends scene with the acquiring of Uppercut Esports' roster to form Furia Uppercut in the CBLOL. The team shortly announced it would rename itself to Furia Esports after the conclusion of the CBLOL 2020 Split 1 tournament.

Current roster

Rocket League

History 
In the 2022 Rocket League Championship Series, Furia Esports would make it to the semifinals of the tournament before losing to tournament winners Team BDS.

Achievements 
1st – Gamers8 2022
2nd – RLCS Season X - South American Championship
3rd-4th – 2022 Rocket League Championship Series
South American RLCS MVP (yanxnz)

Current roster

Rainbow Six Siege

Achievements
5-8th — Six Berlin Major 2022 
9-12th — Six Invitational 2022
5-8th — Six Mexico Major 2022
9-12th — Six Invitational 2021

Current roster

Valorant 

Furia announced its entry into the Valorant scene on 21 January 2021. The team would make an appearance at the inaugural 2021 Valorant Champions but would be eliminated in the group stages. They returned for the 2022 Valorant Champions, but finished the championship in the same place.

In late 2022, Riot Games confirmed Furia would receive a franchise spot in the international VALORANT league system.

Current roster

References

External links 
 

Counter-Strike teams
Esports teams established in 2017
Rocket League teams
Tom Clancy's Rainbow Six Siege teams
Esports teams based in Brazil
Campeonato Brasileiro de League of Legends teams